Jefferson Bingham Miller (born June 27, 1959) is an American politician who served as the U.S. representative for  from 2001 to 2017. A member of the Republican Party, his district included all of Escambia County, Santa Rosa County, Okaloosa County, Walton County, Holmes County and Washington County.

Early life, education, and career
Miller was born in St. Petersburg, Florida. After graduating from Bronson High School in 1977, he served for one year under the National FFA Organization as Florida state secretary. Miller went on to receive a Bachelor of Arts in journalism from the University of Florida in 1984. He was a real estate broker and a deputy sheriff before taking public office.

Personal life

Miller lives in the small town of Chumuckla, Florida (Native American word for "Healing Waters"), which is located about 20 miles northeast of Pensacola, Florida. He and his wife Vicki have two children and four grandchildren and were members of Olive Baptist Church.

Florida legislature
Miller was an executive assistant to Democratic state Agriculture Commissioner Doyle Conner from 1984 to 1988. He was a Democrat until he switched parties in 1997.

Miller was a member of the Florida House of Representatives from November 3, 1998, to October 16, 2001. During his three years there, he was a member of the committees on  Utilities & Telecommunications, Congressional Redistricting, Council for Ready Infrastructure, and Rules, Ethics & Elections. During his second term in the state house, Miller was chairman of the Utilities of Telecommunications Committee. He also oversaw a board in charge of community development in Escambia County.

U.S. House of Representatives

After Republican incumbent Joe Scarborough resigned five months into his fourth term, Miller won a crowded six-way special Republican primary with 54 percent of the vote. By this time, the 1st had become the most Republican district in Florida, and one of the most Republican districts in the South. Thus, for all intents and purposes, Miller assured himself of becoming the district's next congressman with his primary victory. He won the special election with 66 percent of the vote.  He won a full term in 2002 with 75 percent of the vote, and was reelected six more times with only nominal opposition, never dropping below 69 percent of the vote. He didn't face a major-party challenger in 2006 or 2010.

Miller announced that he would not seek reelection during the 2016 elections.

Committee assignments
 Committee on Armed Services
 Subcommittee on Emerging Threats and Capabilities
 Committee on Veterans' Affairs (Chairman)
 Permanent Select Committee on Intelligence

Caucus memberships
 International Conservation Caucus
 Israel Allies Caucus
 Liberty Caucus
 Sportsmen's Caucus
Congressional Constitution Caucus
Friends of Wales Caucus

During the 107th Congress, he served on the House Armed Services Committee (Subcommittee on Total Force and the Subcommittee on Military Research and Development) and the Committee on Veterans’ Affairs.

During the 108th Congress, he served on the House Armed Services Committee (Subcommittee on Readiness and the Subcommittee on Terrorism, Unconventional Threats and Capabilities) and the Committee on Veterans’ Affairs.

During the 109th Congress, he served on the House Armed Services Committee (Subcommittee on Readiness the Subcommittee on Terrorism, Unconventional Threats and Capabilities, and the Subcommittee on Projection Forces), the Committee on Veterans’ Affairs, and the United States Select Bipartisan Committee on Hurricane Katrina Preparation/Response Investigation.

Legislation sponsored
This is a partial list of legislation sponsored by Miller.
 To establish a commission or task force to evaluate the backlog of disability claims of the Department of Veterans Affairs – a bill that would create a task force to address the issue of a large backlog of veterans disability claims.
 TSA Loose Change Act (H.R. 1095; 113th Congress) – a bill that would force the Transportation Security Administration to give the money left behind by passengers at TSA checkpoints to private charities that provide travel-related services to the members of the U.S. military and their families. Miller introduced the bill on March 12, 2013.
 GI Bill Tuition Fairness Act of 2013 (H.R. 357; 113th Congress) – a bill that would require states to offer veterans the in-state tuition price instead of the out-of-state tuition price regardless of whether the veteran met the residency requirement. The bill would also make other changes to veterans' benefits. The bill passed the House of Representatives on February 3, 2014.
 Department of Veterans Affairs Management Accountability Act of 2014 (H.R. 4031; 113th Congress) – a bill that would give the United States Secretary of Veterans Affairs the authority to remove or demote any individual from the Senior Executive Service upon determining that such individual's performance warrants removal or demotion. The bill was written in response to a scandal indicating that some VA hospitals were keeping secret waiting lists for care, the length of which may have led to the deaths of some veterans.
 Veteran Access to Care Act of 2014 (H.R. 4810; 113th Congress) – a bill that would allow United States veterans to receive their healthcare from non-VA facilities under certain conditions. The bill is a response to the Veterans Health Administration scandal of 2014, in which it was discovered that there was systematic lying about the wait times veterans experienced waiting to be seen by doctors. By June 5, 2014, Veterans Affairs internal investigations had identified a total of 35 veterans who had died while waiting for care in the Phoenix VHA system. Miller said that the wait times veterans were forced to face was "a national disgrace."

Electoral history

2001

2002

2004

2006

2008

2010

2012

2014

References

External links
 
 
 

|-

|-

1959 births
21st-century American politicians
American deputy sheriffs
Baptists from Florida
Living people
Members of the Florida House of Representatives
People from Santa Rosa County, Florida
Politicians from St. Petersburg, Florida
Republican Party members of the United States House of Representatives from Florida
University of Florida College of Journalism and Communications alumni
Florida Democrats
American real estate brokers
20th-century American businesspeople
Businesspeople from Florida